The individual jumping competition of the equestrian events at the 2011 Pan American Games took place between October 26–29 at the Guadalajara Country Club.  The defending Pan American champion was Jill Henselwood of Canada.

Schedule
All times are Central Standard Time (UTC-6).

Results

Qualification round

Final rounds

References

Equestrian at the 2011 Pan American Games